John W. Mecom Jr. (born 1940) is the chairman of the John W. Mecom company and former owner of the New Orleans Saints NFL football team.

Mecom is the son of Texas oilman John W. Mecom Sr. and his wife Mary Elizabeth. He was a student at the University of Oklahoma.

He is the owner and chairman of the John W. Mecom company, which was started by his father. The company is primarily involved in real estate and the oil and gas industry.

John, Jr. followed with his own achievements in the oil and gas industry, and in various real estate ventures. He also branched out into professional sports with a special interest in motorsport and football. In the early 1960s he formed his own racing team, Mecom Racing that successfully competed throughout the U.S. and had such drivers as Roger Penske, Pedro Rodriguez, AJ Foyt and Jackie Stewart.
Graham Hill raced his car to victory at the 1966 Indianapolis 500.

In 1967, Mecom purchased the newly enfranchised New Orleans Saints for $8.5 million from the NFL and became the youngest owner of an NFL franchise. He owned the Saints until 1985, when he sold the team for $64 million to New Orleans-native businessman Tom Benson.

References

1940 births
20th-century American businesspeople
Living people
American businesspeople in the oil industry
People from Houston
University of Oklahoma alumni
New Orleans Saints owners